Do Not Disturb is a 2016 British comedy-drama television film starring Catherine Tate and Miles Jupp as a couple who try to repair their marriage in a hotel room. Set in Stratford-upon-Avon, birthplace and burial place of playwright and poet William Shakespeare, the film premiered on Gold on 27 January 2016, coinciding with worldwide celebrations of the 400th anniversary of Shakespeare's death. It was written by Aschlin Ditta and directed by Nigel Cole. 

The film became a reunion between Tate and Aschlin Ditta, who co-wrote the BBC sketch series The Catherine Tate Show (2004–2007).

Cast 

 Catherine Tate as Anna Wilson
 Miles Jupp as John Wilson
 Sian Gibson as Sheila
 Steve Edge as Neil
 Dylan Edwards as Luke
 Milanka Brooks as Svetlana
 Kierston Wareing as Julie
 Colin Michael Carmichael as Hungover Man
 Penny Ryder as Janet

References

External links 

 
 

2016 films
2016 comedy films
2016 in British television
2016 television films
2010s English-language films
British comedy-drama television films
Films set in 2016
2020s British films
400th anniversary of Shakespeare's death